Edgar Daniels (born 1926) is an American former Negro league pitcher who played in the 1940s.

A native of Dallas, Texas, Daniels made his Negro leagues debut in 1946 with the New York Cubans. He played for New York again the following year, during the Cubans' 1947 Negro World Series championship season.

References

External links
 and Seamheads 

1926 births
Possibly living people
Date of birth missing
New York Cubans players
Baseball pitchers
Baseball players from Dallas